Interrogation is a 2016 American action film directed by Stephen Reynolds from a screenplay by Adam Rodin and Michael Finch. The film stars Adam Copeland and C.J. Perry. The film is the 3rd installment in the Action Six Pack series of films. The film was released on direct-to-DVD in the United States on September 20, 2016.

Premise 
A bomb is set to go off on one of the busiest betting days of the year so a smart interrogator is called in to get answers from the prime suspect but as time begins to end, they both soon discover that there is a larger plan in store for them.

Cast 
 Adam "Edge" Copeland as Lucas Nolan
 C.J. "Lana" Perry as Becky
 Patrick Sabongui as Vasti
 Julia Benson as Sara Ward
 Michael Rogers as Mark Bennett
 Erica Carroll as Joan Marian

Production 
Filming took place in Vancouver, British Columbia, Canada over a course of 44 days from March 19 to May 2, 2015.

References

External links 
 
 

2016 films
2016 action films
American action films
2010s English-language films
Films about terrorism
Films shot in Vancouver
Lionsgate films
WWE Studios films
2010s American films